Allegan is a city, county, and township in the U.S. state of Michigan:

 Allegan, Michigan
 Allegan County, Michigan
 Allegan Township, Michigan
 Allegan (meteorite), fell in 1899 in Michigan, United States

See also
 Allergan, company
 Allergen

Henry Schoolcraft neologisms